A Malone antegrade continence enema is a surgical procedure used to create a continent pathway proximal to the anus that facilitates fecal evacuation using enemas.

Description
The operation involves connecting the appendix to the abdominal wall and fashioning a valve mechanism that allows catheterization of the appendix, but avoids leakage of stool through it.  If the appendix was previously removed or is unusable, a neoappendix can be created with a cecal flap.

Indications
It is done to treat fecal incontinence unresponsive to treatment with medications.  It is frequently done with a procedure (Mitrofanoff procedure) to treat urinary incontinence as the two often co-exist, such as in spina bifida.

Cecostomy tube alternative
A percutaneous cecostomy tube (C-tube) is an alternative to a MACE.  It involves the surgical insertion of a catheter into the cecum for the same goal (of performing enemas). Percutaneous cecostomy procedures, like MACEs, have been performed laparoscopically.

Eponym
The procedure is named after the surgeon Padraig Malone who helped popularized it in the 1990s and described it with co-authors as the antegrade continence enema procedure.

See also
Mitrofanoff appendicovesicostomy
Mitrofanoff principle
Monti procedure

References

Urologic surgery